Florio Gabriel Martel (2 March 1923 – 11 August 1990) was a French field hockey player. He competed in the men's tournament at the 1952 Summer Olympics.

References

External links
 

1923 births
1990 deaths
French male field hockey players
Olympic field hockey players of France
Field hockey players at the 1952 Summer Olympics
Place of birth missing
Sportspeople from Lausanne